Dromina GAA (Druimne CLG) is a Gaelic Athletic Association junior hurling club in Dromina, County Cork, Ireland. The club participates in competitions organized by Cork GAA county board and in Avondhu divisional championships.

Achievements
 Cork Junior Hurling Championship (1) 2003
 Cork Minor C Hurling Championship (1) 1996
 North Cork Junior A Hurling Championship (5) 1927, 1998, 2000, 2003, 2014, 2017

References

Gaelic games clubs in County Cork
Hurling clubs in County Cork